is a male Japanese judoka who became world champion in the under 100 kg division in 2015. His favoured technique is Uchi Mata.

Born in Miyazaki, Haga started judo at the age of 5. In 2010, he won the gold medal in the -100 kg weight class at the World Judo Championships Juniors in Agadir.

In 2011, Haga won the Universiade in Shenzhen. In 2015, he won the gold medal in the Half-heavyweight (100 kg) division at the 2015 World Judo Championships.

He won the Grand Slam Tokyo and Grand Prix Düsseldorf in 2015.

Bronze medalist in the 2016 Rio Olympics.

Haga's father, Yoshio, was also a judoka. Like his father who was a winner of the Kodokan Cup, he won the competition in 2010 and 2011.

References

External links
 
 
 
 

1991 births
Living people
Japanese male judoka
Tokai University alumni
Sportspeople from Miyazaki Prefecture
World judo champions
Olympic medalists in judo
Olympic bronze medalists for Japan
Medalists at the 2016 Summer Olympics
Judoka at the 2016 Summer Olympics
Olympic judoka of Japan
Universiade medalists in judo
Universiade gold medalists for Japan
Medalists at the 2011 Summer Universiade
People from Miyazaki (city)
21st-century Japanese people